Donald Dean Bingham (November 7, 1929 – July 17, 1997) was an American football halfback and return specialist who played one season with the Chicago Bears of the National Football League (NFL). He played college football at Sul Ross State University and attended Odessa High School in Odessa, Texas.

He was drafted by the Bears in the seventh round of the 1953 NFL Draft, but did not play for the team until 1956 due to military obligations. In 1954 and 1955, while a member of the United States Marine Corps, he played for the Marine Corps Base Camp Lejeune football team. In his lone season in the NFL, he recorded 36 rushing yards on seven carries and 444 kick return yards; against the Los Angeles Rams, he scored on a 100-yard kickoff return to start the second half, giving the Bears a 17–0 lead. The Bears went on to win 30–21.

References

1929 births
1997 deaths
Players of American football from Oklahoma
American football halfbacks
Sul Ross Lobos football players
Chicago Bears players
United States Marines
People from Shattuck, Oklahoma